Aldo Mondino (Turin, 4 October 1938 – Turin, 10 March 2005) was an Italian sculptor and painter.

Mondino was an artist characterized by an ironic approach to art. He used a range of unconventional materials in his works, including caramel and chocolate, and pioneered the art of painting on linoleum.  He is known for mosaics realized using chocolate, seeds, coffee, legumes and many other different materials.

References

Bibliography 

Angela Vettese, Aldo Mondino, Nuovi Strumenti, 1991
Vittoria Cohen, Aldo Mondino, Particolare, Spazia, 1995
Aldo Mondino, Progetto Siena, Prearo Editore, 1996
Vittoria Cohen, Aldo Mondino dall'Acrilico allo Zucchero, Hopelfulmonster, 2000
Maurizio Sciaccaluga, Risalto, 2001, Teograf
Alberto Fiz, Aldo Mondino Il viaggio, Mazzotta, 2002
Valerio Dehò, The passion for orchids, De Foscherari, 2004
Valerio Dehò, Allegra con brio, Mazzotta, 2006
Vittoria Cohen, MappaMondino, Damiani, 2007
Marco Senaldi, MondoMondino, Damiani, 2007
Alberto Fiz, Calpestar le uova, 2008, SilvanaEditoriale
AA.VV. Cent lumières por Casale Monferrato, 2010, Skira
Valerio Dehò, Aldo Mondino scultore, 2010, Allemandi & C.

External links

 official website

1938 births
2005 deaths
20th-century Italian painters
Italian male painters
21st-century Italian painters
20th-century Italian sculptors
20th-century Italian male artists
Italian male sculptors
21st-century Italian sculptors
Italian contemporary artists
21st-century Italian male artists